Khera Khurd is a census town in North West district in the Indian state of Delhi It is also known as Chota Khera. Narela is the nearest town and Rohini is the nearest urbanised area. Khurd and Kalan Persian language word which means small and Big respectively when two villages have same name then it is distinguished as Kalan means Big and Khurd means Small with Village Name.

Demographics

 India census, Khera Khurd had a population of 8813. Males constitute 56% of the population and females 44%. In Khera Khurd, 13% of the population is under 6 years of age. Haryanvi is the local language.

Politics 
INC, BJP, BSP, AAP are the major political parties.

References

Cities and towns in North West Delhi district
6+4442